The Preaching of the Antichrist is a fresco by the Italian Renaissance painter Luca Signorelli. It is one of the scenes of what is considered his masterpiece, the cycle of frescoes with apocalyptic themes that decorate the Chapel of San Brizio in Orvieto Cathedral (1499–1504). Michelangelo was inspired for his The Last Judgment by observing Signorelli's frescoes in Orvieto.

In this scene the Antichrist is represented preaching in a way analogous to how the sermons of Christ used to be represented. But it is appreciated that it is the devil who whispers what he has to tell. Instead of rays of golden light, they are blood red in color at the point where the Archangel Michael is heading towards Earth to fight the Antichrist.

In the lower left corner are two dark-clad gentlemen; the man to the left is apparently a self-portrait, while the man to the right could be Fra Angelico.

References
Rynck, Patrick de: Luca Signorelli, "El sermón y las obras del Anticristo", pp. 102–103 in Cómo leer la pintura, 2005, Grupo Editorial Random House Mondadori, S.L., 

Paintings by Luca Signorelli
Renaissance paintings
Paintings based on the Bible
1500s paintings
Fresco paintings in Umbria